The 2021–22 season was Manchester City Women's Football Club's 34th season of competitive football and their ninth season in the FA Women's Super League, the highest level of English women's football.

Competitions

Women's Super League

League table

Results summary

Results by matchday

Matches

FA Cup

As a member of the first tier, Manchester City entered the FA Cup in the fourth round proper.

League Cup

As a result of failing to progress from the Champions League qualifying rounds, Manchester City entered the FA Women's League Cup at the group stage. With the groups already drawn prior to their elimination, they were placed into the existing group of four in their geographical region.

Group stage

Knockout stage

Champions League

Manchester City entered the revised format of the Champions League in the second qualifying round.

Second qualifying round

Squad information

Playing statistics

Starting appearances are listed first, followed by substitute appearances after the + symbol where applicable.

|-
|colspan="14"|Players who appeared for the club but left during the season:

|}

Transfers and loans

Transfers in

Transfers out

Loans out

References

Manchester City
2021